Sentencing in England and Wales refers to a bench of magistrates or district judge in a magistrate's court or a judge in the Crown Court passing sentence on a person found guilty of a criminal offence. In deciding the sentence, the court will take into account a number of factors: the type of offence and how serious it is, the timing of any plea of guilty, the defendant's character and antecedents, including their criminal record and the defendant's personal circumstances such as their financial circumstances in the case of a fine being imposed.

In England and Wales, the types of sentence that may be imposed for a particular offence are specified by statute. There are four main types of sentence: discharges, fines, community sentences and custodial (or prison) sentences. If a court convicts a defendant but decides not to impose any punishment, they are discharged conditionally or absolutely. Discharges may be ordered for any offence where the penalty is not fixed by law, although in practice they are used in the least serious offences. Fines are the most common sentence.

For offences considered to be "serious enough", a range of community sentences is available to the court. Community sentences place 'requirements' on the offender - things they must do, or not do, in the community. Requirements can include: doing unpaid work, getting treatment for an addiction (for example drugs), or preventing a defendant from going to a specific place or area. For those offences considered so serious that a non-custodial sentence cannot be justified, a prison sentence may be imposed, either immediate or suspended. The maximum prison sentence in the magistrates' court is six months (which may be imposed consecutively up to 12 months for two triable either-way offences). There is also a range of ancillary sentences available to the courts, such as compensation orders, costs, restraining orders and disqualification orders, depending on the type of offence.

For the most serious offences such as murder, the sentence is fixed as life. Some offences carry minimum sentences, for example, certain firearms offences, "three strikes and you're out" burglaries, using someone to mind a weapon, or those committed by dangerous offenders. There are different sentencing provisions for offenders aged ten to seventeen years old, and some modified provisions for those in the 18-20 age range.

Role of the courts

If a person pleads guilty, or is found guilty of an offence after a trial, the court is required to decide what sentence should be imposed on the offender. Magistrates and judges have a wide range of sentences available to them, however they are subject to certain restrictions. Magistrates' powers are restricted to a maximum custodial sentence of six months for one offence or 12 months for two triable either-way offences (i.e. those offences that can be heard at either the magistrates' court or the Crown Court). The maximum fine the magistrates' court can impose is £5,000. The Criminal Justice Act 2003 has provisions to increase these maximum penalties. Judges in the Crown Court can impose life sentences and there is no upper limit on the fine that may be imposed for particular offences.

The type and maximum level of sentence for each offence is fixed by Parliament in statutes known as Acts of Parliament. For example, the crime of the theft has a fixed maximum of seven years imprisonment. Some offences have a maximum of life imprisonment: these include manslaughter and rape. In such cases the judge has complete discretion when sentencing: the offender may be sent to prison or receive a shorter term, or a non-custodial sentence may passed. The only exception is murder which carries a mandatory life sentence.

The Criminal Justice Act 2003

Overview
The main statute on sentencing is the Criminal Justice Act 2003, which created a framework for sentencing decisions in the courts. Although the Act sets out a number of factors that the court must take into account when passing sentence, the weight to be attached to each factor in a case is a matter for the sentencer. By specifying maximum sentences for particular offences, Parliament indicates its view of the seriousness of the offence. The Sentencing Council helps to refine this process by providing guidance, including sentencing guidelines which suggests a sentencing level in each case. The sentencer is required to consider the guidelines and, if they decide to impose a different type of sentence, to give their reasons for doing so.

Aims of sentencing
Section 142 of the Criminal Justice Act 2003 of the Criminal Justice Act 2003 sets out five purposes of sentencing, to which any court dealing with an offender must have regard:

the punishment of offenders
the reduction of crime (including its reduction by deterrence)
the reform and rehabilitation of offenders
 the protection of the public
the making of reparation by offenders to persons affected by their offences

This is not intended to be a hierarchical order. The Sentencing Council has stated that "the Criminal Justice Act 2003 does not indicate that any one purpose should be treated as more or less important than another. In an individual case, any or all of the purposes may be relevant to a certain degree and it will be for the judge or magistrate to decide how they apply". The Lord Chief Justice has said, “It is no purpose of sentencing to exact vengeance on an offender.”

These considerations do not apply to fixed sentences, minimum sentences or certain orders imposed under the Mental Health Act 1983.

The sentencing process
The court is required to make two principal decisions: the type of sentence and its length (or, in the case of a fine, the amount).
The court will first consider the following factors:

The seriousness of the offence
Such facts as whether the offence was committed on bail for other offences, or whether the defendant is subject to recall to prison or serving a community sentence will usually be highly relevant as aggravating the current offence. This information may reveal underlying issues, such as a drug problem. In motoring cases, previous endorsements on the driving record can have consequences, such as a period of disqualification under the "totting-up" rules.

The court will consider the range of sentence as recommended by the sentencing guidelines, and then have regard to the details of each offence in order to assess its seriousness. This involves assessing the aggravating and mitigating features of the offence. Any hostility based on racial, religious, disability or sexual grounds demonstrated in the commission of the offence will be considered as an aggravating feature. For example, the use of a weapon in an assault is an aggravating feature, or the fact that a person is in a position of trust if he/she commits an offence of theft.

The defendant’s circumstances
The defendant’s character, his previous convictions (most relevant will be those for similar offences) and any personal mitigation, as expressed by the defendant’s advocate or (if unrepresented) by the defendant in person.  An early guilty plea will go towards reducing the sentence—this can result in a discount in up to a third of the sentence, depending when the plea is entered. The defendant’s personal circumstances will also be considered. Their financial circumstances will be highly relevant when a fine, costs or compensation is considered because the court has a duty under section 164 of the Criminal Justice Act 2003 to take these into account when fixing the overall amount.

Pre-sentence reports
In the event of the court considering either a community or a custodial sentence, it can order the offender('s) to have a pre-sentence report taken and prepared by the Probation Service for the court date. The court will have this done because it provides the court with the additional information about the defendant and their circumstances, the risk of re-offending and any personal issues likely to affect the sentencing, e.g. a drug addiction. Psychiatric report may be ordered in appropriate cases. Short reports can be prepared on the day, otherwise the usual time for obtaining a pre-sentence report is three weeks.

Passing sentence
After taking into account all the relevant information, and fixing the sentence accordingly, the court will announce the sentence in open court, addressing the defendant directly and giving reasons for the decisions. Ancillary orders such as costs and disqualification will also be announced at this time.

Appeals
There is a right to appeal from a magistrates' court to the Crown Court within 21 days. Defendants who have received immediate prison sentences may apply for bail on lodging notice of appeal, but the decision to grant bail is entirely within the magistrates' discretion.

Sentencing guidelines

Background
The sentencing guidelines issued by the Sentencing Council are at the heart of the courts' decision-making in sentencing. The development of these guidelines has been incremental, with the Magistrates' Association issuing their own guidelines and the Court of Appeal issuing guideline judgments in particular cases. Following the Crime and Disorder Act 1998, a Sentencing Advisory Panel was established to assist the courts in issuing sentencing guidelines. In 2003, this was supplemented by the Sentencing Guidelines Council comprising a majority of judicial members, which is now known as the Sentencing Council.

Sentencing Council

Created by the Coroners and Justice Act 2009, the Sentencing Council is an independent body which promotes consistent approaches to sentencing by issuing guidelines, analysing the impact of those guidelines on sentencing practice and to improve the confidence of the public by publishing information and promoting awareness of sentencing. The council produces an annual report.

Powers of the courts

The courts have a menu of sentences to choose from. number of different types of sentences available to them. In descending order of severity, the sentences are: custodial sentences, community sentences, fines and discharges. The courts can also make ancillary orders such as costs, compensation orders, and driving disqualifications for road traffic offences.

Custodial sentences for adults (18 years and over)
Custodial sentences range from a minimum of five days to life imprisonment. They include:

 mandatory and discretionary life sentences
 fixed-term sentences
 intermittent custody
 suspended sentences

Section 152 of The Criminal Justice Act 2003 states that the court must not pass a custodial sentence unless it is of the opinion that the offence (or combination of offences): "was so serious that neither a fine alone nor a community sentence can be justified".  The court must always state the reason for imposing a custodial sentence.

Other preconditions of a custodial sentence are that a pre-sentence report has been obtained (in most cases), and the defendant is legally represented or has been offered the opportunity to be represented and has refused.

For offenders aged between 18 and 20 years, the sentence is served in a Young Offenders Institution (YOI).  For those aged 21 years and over, the sentence is served in a prison.

Mandatory life sentences
Although murder carries a mandatory life sentence, it rarely means that the offender will spend the rest of their natural life in prison. A "minimum term" is usually set by the judge to indicate the period the offender must serve in custody before being released on licence. The relevant provisions are contained in the Criminal Justice Act 2003 It gives judges a clear starting point for the minimum period to be considered, ranging from a "whole-life" term down to 12 years.  The offences for which a whole-life term should be imposed on an offender aged 21 years or over at the time of the offence are as follows:

 the murder of two or more persons, where each murder involves a substantial degree of premeditation or planning or the abduction of the victim or sexual or sadistic conduct; or
 the murder of a child if involving the abduction of the child or sexual or sadistic motivation
 a murder done for the purpose of advancing a political, religious, racial or ideological cause or
 a murder by an offender previously convicted of murder.

Another starting point is 30 years, which applies to offenders aged 18 years and over at the time of the offence in respect of the following categories of murder:
 murder of a police or prison officer in the course of his duty;
 murder involving the use of a firearm or explosive;
 murder for gain (e.g. a contract killing or murder during the course of a burglary);
 killing intended to obstruct the course of justice (e.g. murder of a witness);
 murder involving sexual or sadistic conduct;
 the murder of two or more persons (other than those for which a whole life starting point is appropriate);
 murder motivated by race, religion or sexual orientation; and
 a murder within the category of cases that would otherwise attract a whole life starting point committed by an offender aged under 21 at the time of the offence.

The starting point for a murder committed with a knife is a minimum of 25 years.  This starting point was introduced following the murder of Ben Kinsella.

The next starting point is 15 years, which applies to any other murder committed by a person aged 18 years or over at the time of the offence.  For offenders aged 17 years or under at the time of the offence, the starting point is 12 years.

Upon determining the appropriate starting point for the minimum term, the court will consider the aggravating or mitigating factors of the offence and may increase or decrease the term in order to arrive at the appropriate minimum term. Aggravating factors may include: a significant degree of planning or premeditation; victim particularly vulnerable because of age or disability; mental or physical suffering inflicted on the victim before death; abuse of position of trust; use of duress or threats against another person to facilitate commission of the offence; victim providing public service or performing public duty; or concealment, destruction or dismemberment of body. Mitigating factors may include: intention to cause serious bodily harm rather than to kill; lack of premeditation; offender suffering a mental disorder or disability which lowered his degree of culpability; 4 provocation (falling short of a defence of provocation); any element of self-defence; belief by the offender that the murder was an act of mercy; and the age of the offender.

A sentence of life imprisonment is available to the court for offenders over the age of 18 who are convicted of a second serious sexual or violent offence. In exceptional circumstances, the judge has a discretion not to impose a life sentence.

Discretionary life sentences
Life imprisonment is available to judges as a discretionary sentence for a number of serious offences.

Home Detention Curfew
The Crime and Disorder Act 1998. allow for the early release of offenders from prison on the conditions that a curfew condition is imposed, which is enforced by electronic tagging. The period of curfew is increased with the length of the sentence.  There is no automatic right to a home detention curfew each offender case is assessed individually. If a home detention curfew is not granted, a prisoner must serve half their sentence before being released on license. Home Detention orders were introduce to aid prisoners structure their lives and help to reduce recidivism rates.

Extended sentences
Sections 224 and 227 of the Criminal Justice Act 2003 require the court to pass an extended sentence of imprisonment (if the offender was aged 21 or over on conviction) or an extended sentence of detention in a young offender institution (if he was aged 18, 19 or 20 on conviction) in the following circumstances:
The offence must be:
a) one of the violent or sexual offences specified in Schedule 15; and
b) punishable by a determinate sentence of less than 10 years.
There must be a significant risk to the public of serious harm (i.e. death or serious personal injury) caused by the offender’s committing further Schedule 15 offences.

The 'purposes of sentencing' provisions of section 142 of the Act and the requirement that the offence(s) must be so serious that neither a fine alone nor a community sentence can be justified do not apply.	

"Serious harm" means death or serious personal injury, whether physical or psychological: S. 224 (3) CJA 2003. See R v Lang and others [2005] (The Times, 10 November) where the Court of Appeal indicated that previous case law would still be considered relevant guidance in assessing this issue.

Minimum sentences
These are the so-called "three strikes and you're out" provisions. There is a mandatory minimum sentence of seven years for an adult who is convicted on three separate occasion of dealing in Class A drugs - section 110 Power of Criminal Courts (Sentencing) Act 2000. Likewise, there is a minimum mandatory sentence of three years for anyone convicted of burglary of a dwelling for the third time - section 111 of the same Act. For each sentence, court has discretion not to impose the minimum term if it considers it would be unjust having regard to the particular circumstances of the offence(s) or the offender. The court must state the particular circumstances when passing sentence.

Suspended prison sentences
The court has power to impose a suspended sentence of imprisonment of up to two years. The features of this sentence are:

 the offence must pass the custody threshold of being 'so serious'
 the term of imprisonment must be between 14 days and 6 months (24 months in the Crown Court)
 the court can order the offender to undertake requirements
 the sentence can be coupled with a fine
 a supervision period can be imposed of not less than 6 months and no longer than the suspended period of the sentence or two years, whichever is the shorter
 the order may be periodically reviewed and
 the sentence will be activated if the offender fails to comply with any requirement or commits any further offence(s) during the operational period, unless there are exceptional circumstances

It is at the court's discretion to fix the period of suspension (known as the operational period), which can be for any period up to two years. If during this time, the offender does not commit any further offences, the prison sentence will not be implemented. However, in the event that the offender does re-offend during the operational period, then the sentence is 'activated' and the offender will serve the suspended sentence along with any sentence given for the new offence. A suspended sentence is usually implemented to run consecutively to a term of imprisonment imposed for the new offence.

Community orders
The Criminal Justice Act 2003 created one community order under which a combination of requirements can be imposed on an offender aged 16 years or over. These requirements (blue quote-box) can be tailored to fit the offender's needs as well as punishing him/her for the offence. Most of the requirements are self-explanatory, such as drug rehabilitation and alcohol treatment, and all are listed in s 177 of The Criminal Justice Act 2003.

Unpaid work requirements
An unpaid requirement requires an offender to work between 40 and 300 hours on a suitable project organised by the probation service. The exact number of hours will be specified by the court and are usually worked in 8-hour shifts at weekends. The type of work will vary depending on locality and the probation service operating the scheme. For example, the offender may be required to paint school buildings, help build a play centre or work on projects clearing public areas. Eric Cantona, the French footballer, was ordered to help coach youth footballing sessions when he was convicted for assaulting a fan.

Prohibited activity requirement
The notion behind prohibited activity orders is to prevent the offender from committing further offences of the same type they have  just been convicted of. Often an offender is prohibited from going into a certain area where he or she has caused trouble. In some cases offenders have been banned from wearing particular garments such as a 'hoodie'. In 2006, a defendant who was found guilty of criminal damage was banned from carrying paint, marker pens or dye ink.

Curfew requirement
A curfew requirement can require that an offender will be at a fixed address for between 2–12 hours during a 24-hour period for up to six months. The order can be enforced with electronic tagging. These orders can only be issued if there is monitoring system for curfew in their area. Monitoring can be done via spot-check, with private security firm sending employees to check on an offender at home or but more commonly by electronic tagging. The cost of tagging is estimated to be £675 per month per offender. This compares favourably with keeping an offender in prison which is estimated at £1,555 per offender per month. A 2007 report showed that 58 per cent of offenders broke the terms of their tagging order and more than a quarter committed further offences.

Exclusion requirement
An exclusion requirement prohibits an offender from going to certain place. They are designed to prevent re-offending by keeping an offender away from the place where they are likely to commit offences. The requirement can specify different places on different days.  It can be imposed for up to two years in respect of offenders aged 16 years and over, or a maximum of three months for those under the age of 16. For example, a repeat shoplifter could be banned from going to a particular shopping center.

Supervision requirement
Under a supervision requirement the offender is placed under the supervision of a probation office for a period of up to three years. During this supervision period the offender must attend appointments with the officer or with any other person as directed by the supervising officer. By the Criminal Justice Act 2003, such a requirement may be imposed for the purpose of 'promoting the offender's rehabilitation'.

Fines
In the magistrates' Court the most common disposal is the fine. The maximum fine will depend upon the level of fine specified for the offence:

Magistrates can also fine up to £20,000 for offences under certain regulations, such as a breach of the health and safety in the workplace. In the Crown Court the fines can be limitless.

The court will enquire into the financial circumstances of the offender and fix the fine at the level reflecting seriousness of the offence, taking account of the circumstances of the case and the means to pay.

Discharges
Discharges may either be conditional or absolute.
A conditional discharge is where the court discharges an offender on the condition that no further offences are committed during a specified period up to a maximum of three years. They are used when it is deemed that a punitive sentence is unnecessary. If the offender re-offends during the conditional discharge period, the court can re-sentence for the original offence as well as passing sentence for the latest offence(s).

An absolute discharge means that, in effect, no penalty is imposed. Such a sentence is likely to be ordered where an offender has technically committed an offence but is morally blameless for it. They are usually reserved for the most minor offences but can, exceptionally, be ordered in serious cases (see the signalman in the 1892 Thirsk rail crash).

In both cases, the court may still make ancillary orders such as costs and compensation.

Deferred sentences
If a court believes that an offender's circumstances are about to change, sentence may be deferred for up to six months in order to see whether the change makes a difference to the offender's behaviour. A sentence will only normally be deferred where the change in circumstances is such that the punishment will not be necessary, or a lesser penalty will be imposed if the offender complies with the terms of the deferred sentence. The offender must consent to the deferment.

Ancillary powers of the courts
The courts can make orders which are ancillary to the main sentence. They are aimed at compensating victims of offences and/or ensuring that an offender does not benefit from their offences.

Compensation and restitution orders
The courts can make an order that the offender pay a sum of money to his victim in compensation. There is a presumption that the court will make an order in an appropriate case since reasons must be given if no order is made. There is now NO upper limit on the maximum compensation that can be imposed in the Magistrates' Court (except for juveniles, where it is £5,000 per offence). In the event that the offender still has the stolen property the court will make a restitution order for the return of the goods to the victim.

Disqualification from driving
Where an offender who is charged and convicted with a driving offence, the courts have the power to disqualify the offender from driving for a certain length of time, which will depend on the type and severity of the offence. There is a mandatory minimum 12 months for drink-driving offences. For previous drink-driving convictions within the preceding ten years, the minimum period of disqualification is three years. The courts also have the power to disqualify offenders for any offence where a vehicle was used in the commission of the offence, for example using a car to commit burglaries in rural areas.

Deprivation and forfeiture orders
The court can order an offender to be deprived of property he has used to commit an offence.  A person convicted of a drink-driving offence can be deprived of their vehicle.  The Proceeds of Crime Act 1995 also gives the courts the power to take from criminals all profits from a crime up to six years before conviction.

Young offender sentences
The term "young offender" includes all offenders under the age of 21.  However, those in the 18 to 21 (inclusive) age group are generally subject to the provisions of the adult court, although in the case of custody, they are sentenced detention in a young offenders' institute rather than imprisonment.  There are considerable variations in the different sentences available for those under 18, under 16, under 14 and under 12.  Offenders under 18 are normally dealt with in the youth court.  In a case where a youth is jointly charged with an adult, they will both appear before the adult court, although that court may choose to remit the youth to the youth court for sentencing.

Young offenders' institutions
A sentence of detention in a young offenders' institution (or YOI) is available to the court in respect of those between the ages of 15 and 21 years (inclusive) who have committed imprisonable offences.  The relevant provisions are contained in the Criminal Justice Act 1982, which introduced the sentence to replace borstal training.  YOI's are managed by the Prison Service. The term of detention is up to the maximum allowed for adult imprisonment for the relevant offence, and the same custody threshold ("so serious") applies as in the case of the adult court.  The minimum period of detention is 21 days.

Detention and training orders
This sentence was implemented by the Crime and Disorder Act 1998. for offenders aged 12 to 17 years (inclusive) who are persistent offenders or commit serious offences.  The sentences will be between four months and two years, with part of the sentence being served in custody and part half under supervision the community.  The term must be specified as four, six, eight, ten, twelve, eighteen or twenty-four months.  The "youth offending team" (YOT) will draw up a plan of supervision which the offender is required to meet upon their release from custody - failure to do so may result in their being brought back to court and returned to detention. Supervision may be under an officer of the YOT, a probation officer or social worker.

Detention for serious crimes
In cases involving very serious offences, the courts have additional power to order that the offender be detained for longer periods. For those aged between 10 and 13, this power is only available where the crime committed carries a maximum sentence of at least 14 years for adults. For those aged between 14 and 17, it is also available for causing death by dangerous driving, or for causing death by driving under the influence by drink or drugs. The length imposed by the judge cannot exceed the maximum sentence available for an adult.

Detentions at His Majesty's pleasure
Offenders aged 10–17 who are convicted of murder must be ordered to be detained during His Majesty's pleasure. This is an indeterminate sentence which allows the offender to be released when suitable. The judge in the case can recommend a minimum number of years that should be served before release is considered, and the Lord Chief Justice will then set the tariff. If an offender reaches 22 while they are still serving the sentence they will then be transferred to an adult prison.

Community orders
Community orders can only be given to young offenders aged 16 and over. The same requirements used for adults can be imposed, including an unpaid work requirement, an activity requirement, a prohibited and a curfew requirement. The only exception is the curfew limit which can be imposed from 10 upwards.

Attendance centre orders
Attendance centre orders are only available to offenders aged 10–25. They involve attendance at a special centre for two hours per week up to a maximum of 36 hours for those aged between 16 and 24, and a maximum of 24 hours those aged 10 to 15. The minimum number of hours is usually 12, but can be less for those aged under 14. The centres used to be run by the police but are now run by the probation service; they are usually held on a Saturday afternoon and will include organized leisure activities and training. An Attendance centre order cannot be made if the offender has served a period of detention prior to the new offence.

Supervision orders
Those who are 18 and under can be placed under supervision for a period of up to three years, supervision being provided by one of the following:

 the local social services
 a probation officer
 a member of the Youth Offending Team

Action plan orders
Under Section 69 of the Crime and Disorder Act 1998, a new community order called Action Plan Order which the courts can impose on offenders under the age of 18. In the government whitepaper No More Excuses, the government said it was 'intended to be a short to be a short intensive programme of community intervention combining punishment, rehabilitation and reparation to change offending behaviors and further crime'. Action Plan Orders place the offender under supervision setting out requirements the offender has to comply with in respect to their action and where about during a period of three months.

These requirements can be any of the following:

 to participate in set activities
 to present themself to a specified person at stated times and places
 to attend an attendance centre
 to stay away from certain places
 to comply with arrangements for their education
 to make reparation.

Fines
The maximum amount that can be fined varies with the age of the young offender. Those between 10 and 13 years can only be fined a maximum of £250. Those aged between 14–17 the maximum is £1,000. Those aged 18 and over are subject to the normal limit of a magistrates' court: £5,000.

Reparation orders
Repartition orders can be imposed on offenders under the age of 18. However, this order cannot be made in combination with a custodial sentence, Community Service order or an Action Plan Order. An order will require the offender to make reparation, as specified in the order, to a person or person who were victims of the offence, or were otherwise affected by it, or to the community at large. The order is for a maximum of 24 hours and the reparation order must be completed under supervision within three months of its imposition. An order for direct reparation to a victim can only be made with that person's consent.

Discharges
Discharges may be used for defendants of any age, and are commonly used for first-time young offenders who have committed minor crimes. The courts cannot conditionally discharge an offender in the following circumstances:

 where a child or young offender who is convicted of an offence has been warned within the previous two years, unless there are exceptional circumstance which must be explained in open court.
 where the offender is in breach of an anti social behavior order
 where the offender is in breach of a sex offender order.

Reprimands and warnings
Reprimands and warnings are not sentences passed by the court, but methods by which the police can deal with offenders without bringing a case to court.
For a reprimand or warning to be given, there has to be evidence that a child or young person has committed an offence and admits it. The police must also be satisfied that it would not be in the public interest for the offender to be prosecuted in court. A reprimand or warning can only be given if the offender has never been convicted of any offence. There is no maximum limit to the number of times that an offender can be 'cautioned' by the police. The first step is the reprimand. This can only be given if the young offender has not been previously reprimanded or warned. Even then, it should not be used where the police officer considers the offence so serious that a warning would be required. Any offender can be warned only if he has not been warned before or if an earlier warning was more than two years before. The child or young offender when warned must be referred to the Youth Offending Team. The YOT will assess the case and, unless it considers it inappropriate to do so, arranges for the offender to participate in a rehabilitation scheme.

Parental responsibility
If parent of a young offender agree, they can be bound over to keep their child under control for a set period of time up to one year. If the child re-offends then a maximum fine is payable of £1000. If a parent unreasonably refuses to be bound over then the court can fine that parent instead.  Parents can also be bound over to ensure that a young offender complies with their community sentence order(s). Where a young offender under 16 who is fined then the court is required to take the parents financial situation into account in deciding the order.

Parenting orders
A parenting order is an order under the Crime and Disorder Act 1998. Parenting orders are intended to offer training and support to parents to aid changing their children's offending behavior. Under such an order a parent can be mandated to attend counselling or guidance sessions for up to three months on maximum basis of one session per week. Also, the parent may be required to comply with the conditions imposed by the courts; for example, taking the child to and from school and ensuring an adult supervises the child after school a court may make decide to make a parenting order where:

 the courts makes a child safety order
 the court makes an anti-social behavior order (or sex offender order) in respect of a child
 a child or young person is convicted of an offence
 a parent is convicted of an offence relating to truancy under the Education Act 1996.

Parenting orders should only be made if it is desirable in the interest of preventing the conduct which gave rise to the order. There is the presumption that penetrating order will be issued to the parents of those under 16 who are committed of an offence unless it is felt as not desirable if so the court must state why.

Youth Offending Teams

The Crime and Disorder Act 1998 made mandatory requirements that each local authority in England and Wales set up one or more Youth Offending Teams (YOTs) in their receptive area. The aim of their establishment is to co-ordinate and build co-operation between agencies involved in youth justice and especially the probation service and social services. YOTs are responsible for co-ordination of the prisons of the youth justice service in their area. The composition of such a team must include a probation officer, a police officer, a representative of the local health authority and a person nominated by the chief education officer. Anyone else who is deem appropriate may joint the task force. The role and responsibilities of YOTs is designated under s 66 of the Crime and Disorder Act 1998, any offender who is warned must referred to the local YOT, Youth Courts also refer offender to the YOT.

Mentally ill offenders

The law of England and Wales recognises that, so far as possible, mentally ill defenders should not receive punitive sentences, however, they should receive treatment. The courts have a wide array of power available to them, in addition to the ordinary sentences which can be passed, there are special provisions aimed at treating mentally ill offenders in a suitable manner. The primary additional powers available to the courts are to:give the offender a community sentence, with a requirement that he or she attends for treatment; make a hospital order or to make a restriction order under s.41 of the Mental Health Act 1983. The community sentences are provided in s 177 of The Criminal Justice Act 2003'. specifically s(h) 'a mental health treatment requirement'. The details of such treatments can be found in Section 207 Mental health treatment requirement of the Criminal Justice Act 2003.

A community order requiring treatment of offender will only be made if the court is satisfied that the mental condition is treatable, and that there is no need to make a hospital order. A hospital order will only be made if the condition suffered by the offender make it appropriate that the offender should stay in hospital for the treatment. However, there are some instance where the protection of the public is a key element in issuing a sentence. Under s 41 of the Mental Health Act 1983 offenders who have severe mental health problems, who are considered a danger to the public, can be sent to a secure hospital such as Broadmoor Hospital. These issues can only be done through the Crown Court. The order can be if necessary for an indefinite period of time. If the offender has been issued with an indefinite sentence they can only be released with permission of the Home Secretary or following a hearing of the Mental Health Review Tribunal.

Reform 
In 2018, the Law Commission launched a project led by David Ormerod QC that intends to produce a single "sentencing code" to codify and simplify a complex and confusing set of statutory provisions. This has led to the introduction of the Sentencing Act 2020.

See also

 Criminal Justice Act 2003
 Sentencing Council
 Lurking doubt

References

England
English criminal law